Afipia felis is the type species of the Afipia bacterial genus. It was formerly thought to cause cat-scratch disease. It is a Gram-negative, oxidase-positive, nonfermentative rod in the alpha-2 subgroup of the class Proteobacteria. It is motile by means of a single flagellum. It is noted for having the longest authority citation of any accepted species.

References

Further reading

External links
LPSN

Type strain of Afipia felis at BacDive -  the Bacterial Diversity Metadatabase

Nitrobacteraceae
Bacteria described in 1991